Kim Jang-hoon (born 14 August 1963) is a South Korean singer, known for his rock ballads.

Early life and education
Kim dropped out of school and worked as a DJ at cafes. In 1991, he released his debut album. Cho Dongik mainly wrote and arranged his music. That album included "On a sunny day", written by You Hee-yeol, "Always between you and I", written by Cho Dongik, "To the tomorrow", written by Cho Dongik. His second album including "Now", was released in 1993. His third album was I just sang my song.

Career
On 27 September 2011, Kim released the single, "Breakups are So Like Me" which featured Heechul of boy band Super Junior, who also starred in the music video. Since Heechul enlisted for mandatory military service on 1 September, his parts during the performance on Music Bank and Show! Music Core, was filled in by bandmates, Yesung, Eunhyuk and Shindong, who performed with Kim.

Also, Kim is on many popular T.V. variety programs as an entertainer. Kim is the #1 musician at University Campuses for 10 years and his popularity ranges from people in their teens to their 60s.

Since his debut, Kim has twenty-two (22) albums, including his best remix albums, digital singles, and Original Soundtrack albums. Moreover, throughout his career, Kim performed at over 1,000 different concerts and shows, including fifteen (15) of his own exclusive concerts, in China and South Korea.

In 2012, Kim released his 10th full-length album, the first in six years. He released a music video for the title track "Nothing" featuring Paris Hilton.

In 2014, Kim released, along with the girl group Crayon Pop, a new single titled "HERO".

Charitable work
In South Korea, Kim is widely known as the "Donation Angel", donating over 10 billion South Korean won over the course of ten years to various causes. He is active in the Liancourt Rocks territorial dispute between Japan and South Korea.

In July 2012, while during his concert at the Nokia Theatre L.A. Live in California, Kim received a letter signed by U.S. President Barack Obama, notifying him of his winning the President's Volunteer Service Award.

Discography

Public service
 2008, Publicity Ambassador for Voluntary Agency Network of Korea (VANK)
 2008, Publicity Ambassador for Olympic Park
 2022, Ambassadors for the Festival of Culture and Arts with Disabilities with Jung Eun-hye

Awards 
 2002: The Prize for Good Deed Star in Current Year
 2008: 4th The Grand Prize for Contribution to Society-Special Award
 2008: 6th The Prize for Glorious Civilized  People
 2012: President's Volunteer Service Award

References

Further reading
 http://news.khan.co.kr/kh_news/khan_art_view.html?artid=200711261744051&code=210000
 http://music.naver.com/artist.nhn?m=bio&artistid=38
 http://music.naver.com/artist.nhn?m=allalbums&artistid=38
 http://music.naver.com/artist.nhn?m=allalbums&artistid=38&page=2
 http://www.inmuz.com/bbs/search.php?ss=1&sx=1&kw=김장훈
 http://www.inmuz.com/bbs/view.php?id=album&no=738&keyword=김장훈&sn=off&ss=on&sc=off
 http://www.inmuz.com/bbs/view.php?id=album&no=739&keyword=김장훈&sn=off&ss=on&sc=off&sx=on
 http://www.inmuz.com/bbs/view.php?id=album&no=740&keyword=김장훈&sn=off&ss=on&sc=off&sx=on
 http://kin.naver.com/detail/detail.php?d1id=3&dir_id=30402&eid=G152cOZZSymIdDfnbsQONY0Gen+Tn/kv&qb=sejA5cjGvLHH4A==&pid=fbac7loQsDlssv9RKQlsss--288754&sid=5Cc-0neEW0gAACDON08AAAA5

External links 

 
 

1967 births
Living people
South Korean male film actors
South Korean male television actors
South Korean humanitarians
South Korean pop rock singers
South Korean television personalities